Det blir jul på Möllegården ("Christmas Comes to Möllegården") was the Sveriges Television's Christmas calendar in 1980.

Plot
The series described Scanian Christmas traditions, circa 100 years earlier. Animal slaughter scenes frightened some young viewers.

References

External links

1980 Swedish television series debuts
1980 Swedish television series endings
Sveriges Television's Christmas calendar
Television shows set in Sweden
Scania in fiction
Television series set in the 1880s